Barna Papucsek (born 11 October 1989) is a Hungarian professional footballer who plays for Nyíregyháza.

Club statistics

Updated to games played as of 19 May 2019.

References
MLSZ 
HLSZ 

1989 births
Living people
Footballers from Budapest
Hungarian footballers
Association football defenders
FC Tatabánya players
Vasas SC players
Hévíz FC footballers
Fehérvár FC players
Puskás Akadémia FC players
Szolnoki MÁV FC footballers
Kisvárda FC players
Balmazújvárosi FC players
Nyíregyháza Spartacus FC players
Nemzeti Bajnokság I players
Nemzeti Bajnokság II players